Khanloq (also Romanized as Khānloq) is a village in Firuzeh Rural District, in the Central District of Firuzeh County, Razavi Khorasan Province, Iran. At the 2006 census, its population was 566, in 143 families.

References 

Populated places in Firuzeh County